3320 or variant, may refer to:

In general
 A.D. 3320, a year in the 4th millennium CE
 3320 BC, a year in the 4th millennium BCE
 3320, a number in the 3000 (number) range

Other uses
 3320 Namba, an asteroid in the Asteroid Belt, the 3320th asteroid registered
 ALFA-PROJ Model 3320, a handgun
 Nokia 3320, a cellphone
 Texas Farm to Market Road 3320, a state highway

See also